The Jackson State Tigers baseball represents Jackson State University, which is located in Jackson, Mississippi. The Tigers are an NCAA Division I college baseball program that competes in the Southwestern Athletic Conference.

The Jackson State Tigers play all home games on campus at Braddy Field. Under the direction of head coach Omar Johnson who has served as head coach since 2007.

Since the program's inception, 7 Tigers have gone on to play in Major League Baseball.

Head coaches

Notable players
 Oil Can Boyd
 Robert Braddy
 Wes Chamberlain
 Dave Clark
 Dewon Day
 Howard Farmer
 Mike Farmer
 Curt Ford
 Marvin Freeman
 Kelvin Moore

See also
List of NCAA Division I baseball programs

References

External links